The Lavagna is an Italian river in the province of Genoa.

Geography 
The source is near Neirone and it flows southeast before joining the Sturla near Carasco thus creating the Entella.

References

See also
 List of rivers of Italy

Tributaries of the Entella
Rivers of the Province of Genoa
Rivers of the Apennines
Rivers of Italy